is a Japanese romance josei manga series written and illustrated by Tsunami Umino. The original title is from a Hungarian proverb: "Running away is shameful, but useful". It was published by Kodansha, with serialization in Kiss magazine since November 9, 2012 and eleven volumes released across the whole series timeframe.

The series later got a live-action adaptation that began airing on TBS in October 2016, with Yui Aragaki and Gen Hoshino as the leads. Viki has licensed the series in North America. Aragaki and Hoshino, the leads, would go on to marry in real life.

Characters

Portrayed by: Yui Aragaki
The 25-year-old protagonist. A graduate student who was recently fired from her temporary job. Mikuri studied psychology in graduate school and is a licensed clinical psychologist, and often internally psycho-analyzes Hiramasa. After losing her temp job, she is given the chance to become a housekeeper at Hiramasa's home, desperate for any source of income. After learning that her parents were about to move to the countryside when her father retires, she enters a contract marriage with Hiramasa, allowing her a place to live and a stable source of employment.

Portrayed by: Gen Hoshino
The 36-year-old male lead. A salaryman of who is one of the top workers in his company. Despite being 36, he is still a virgin and calls himself a "professional bachelor". He enters a contract common law marriage with Mikuri because he thinks it will be useful to have someone live with him who can take care of him if need be. Fairly quickly after marrying Mikuri, he begins to have feelings and desires for her, which he tries to suppress. Mikuri speculates that Hiramasa struggles with hypervigilant narcissism, as he completely avoids any situation that may interrupt his way of life or self image.

 Portrayed by: Ryohei Otani
Hiramasa's coworker. He is 27 and often wonders if marriage is a good thing, and breaks up with his girlfriend in the first volume after she wants marriage and he does not. He later moves into the same neighborhood as Mikuri's aunt Yuri.

 Portrayed by: Yuriko Ishida
 Mikuri's 52-year-old aunt who insists Mikuri calls her by her first name and not as "Aunt." She is single and has never married, and mentions that she made it to menopause a virgin. Yuri is shown to be a career woman with a good amount of wealth, but laments that she should have gotten married when she was younger even if it would end in divorce. She sees Kazami break up with his girlfriend at the restaurant and holds resentment towards him.

 Portrayed by: Arata Furuta
 Hiramasa's gay coworker who socializes with him and Kazami. When he is first invited to Hiramasa and Mikuri's apartment, he shows his skills as a great cook. He catches on early that Hiramasa and Mikuri are not a real couple, but fantasizes that Hiramasa married Mikuri to hide that he is in a relationship with Kazami, which is untrue.

Portrayed by: Takashi Fujii
 Another of Hiramasa's coworkers, he is a typical married man with kids.

Volumes

Reception
Volume 5 reached the 47th place on the weekly Oricon manga charts and, as of April 19, 2015, had sold 20,288 copies.

The series won the award for Best Shōjo Manga at the 39th Kodansha Manga Awards.

The television drama was very popular and the ending theme Koi (恋) by Gen Hoshino featuring the cast dancing the Koi Dance ("love dance") became a craze in Japan. As of 2023, the music video for the song currently has over 280 million views on YouTube.

References

External links

Official TV drama website 

2016 Japanese television series debuts
Josei manga
Kodansha manga
Romance anime and manga
TBS Television (Japan) dramas
Television shows set in Yokohama
Winner of Kodansha Manga Award (Shōjo)
Works by Akiko Nogi